Theodore, Philippa, and companions were martyrs, who suffered crucifixion during the reign of Elagabalus. Theodore of Perge was a Roman soldier, and Philippa was his mother. Their companions who suffered martyrdom with them, included Socrates, a fellow soldier, Dionysius, a former pagan priest who converted to Christianity, and Dioscorus.

References

220 deaths
3rd-century Christian martyrs
Year of birth unknown
Groups of Christian martyrs of the Roman era
People executed by crucifixion
Groups of Roman Catholic saints